Cosmicism is the literary philosophy developed and used by the American writer H. P. Lovecraft in his fiction. Lovecraft was a writer of philosophically intense horror stories that involve occult phenomena like astral possession and alien miscegenation, and the themes of his fiction over time contributed to the development of this philosophy.

The philosophy of cosmicism states that "there is no recognizable divine presence, such as a god, in the universe, and that humans are particularly insignificant in the larger scheme of intergalactic existence." The most prominent theme is humanity's fear of their insignificance in the face of an incomprehensibly large universe: a fear of the cosmic void.

Analysis
Cosmicism and human centric views of the universe are incompatible. Cosmicism shares many characteristics with nihilism, though one important difference is that cosmicism tends to emphasize the insignificance of humanity and its doings, rather than summarily rejecting the possible existence of some higher purpose (or purposes); e.g., in Lovecraft's Cthulhu stories, it is not the absence of meaning that causes terror for the protagonists, as it is their discovery that they have absolutely no power to change anything in the vast, indifferent universe that surrounds them. In Lovecraft's stories, whatever meaning or purpose may be invested in the actions of the cosmic beings is completely inaccessible to the human characters.

Lovecraft's cosmicism was a result of his feeling of humanity's existential helplessness in the face of what he called the "infinite spaces" opened up by scientific thought, and his belief that humanity was fundamentally at the mercy of the vastness and emptiness of the cosmos. In his fictional works, these ideas are often explored humorously ("Herbert West–Reanimator," 1922), through fantastic dream-like narratives ("The Dream Quest of Unknown Kadath," 1927), or through his well-known Cthulhu Mythos ("The Call of Cthulhu," 1928, and others). Common themes related to cosmicism in Lovecraft's fiction are the insignificance of humanity in the universe and the search for knowledge ending in disaster.

Lovecraftian characters notably become insane from the elimination of recognizable geometry. Lovecraft's work also tended to impress fear of the other onto the reader, such as in "The Dunwich Horror" and "Dagon", often portraying that which is unknown as a terrible threat to the rest of humanity. This is possibly a reflection of his own personal views, which were often insular and paranoid.

Cosmic indifferentism
Though cosmicism appears deeply pessimistic, H.P. Lovecraft thought of himself as neither a pessimist nor an optimist but rather a "scientific" or "cosmic" indifferentist, a theme expressed in his fiction.  In Lovecraft's work, human beings are often subject to powerful beings and other cosmic forces, but these forces are not so much malevolent as they are indifferent toward humanity. This indifference is an important theme in cosmicism. The noted Lovecraft scholar S. T. Joshi asserts that "Lovecraft constantly engaged in (more or less) genial debates on religion with several colleagues, notably the pious writer and teacher Maurice W. Moe. Lovecraft was a strong and antireligious atheist; he considered religion not merely false but dangerous to social and political progress." As such, Lovecraft's cosmicism is not religious at all, but rather a version of his mechanistic materialism. Lovecraft thus embraced a philosophy of cosmic indifferentism. He believed in a meaningless, mechanical, and uncaring universe that human beings, with their naturally limited faculties, could never fully understand. His viewpoint made no allowance for religious beliefs which could not be supported scientifically. The incomprehensible, cosmic forces of his tales have as little regard for humanity as humans have for insects.

Though personally irreligious, Lovecraft used various gods in his stories, particularly the Cthulhu-related tales, to expound cosmicism. However, Lovecraft never conceived of them as supernatural, but extraterrestrials who understand and obey a set of natural laws which to human understanding seem magical. These beings (the Great Old Ones, Outer Gods and others) – though dangerous to humankind – are portrayed as neither good nor evil, and human notions of morality have no significance for these beings. Indeed, they exist in cosmic realms beyond human understanding. As a symbol, this is representative of the kind of universe that Lovecraft believed in. Though some of these beings have – and in some cases create – cults to honor them, to the vast majority of these beings the human race is so insignificant that they aren't given any consideration whatsoever.

See also
 Absurdism
 Apatheism
 Determinism
 Existential nihilism
 Existentialism
 Fatalism
 Lovecraftian horror
 Misanthropy
 Misotheism

References

General references

Inline citations

H. P. Lovecraft
Philosophical theories
Types of existentialism
20th-century neologisms
Cosmism